China competed in the 2005 East Asian Games which were held in Macau, China from October 29, 2005 to November 6, 2005.

See also
 China at the Asian Games
 China at the Olympics
 Sports in China

2005 East Asian Games
2005
2005 in Chinese sport